General elections were held in East Germany on 18 March 1990. They were the only free and fair parliamentary elections in the history of the country, and the first free and fair election held in that part of Germany since November 1932.

The Alliance for Germany, led by the East German branch of the Christian Democratic Union (CDU), won 192 seats and emerged as the largest bloc in the 400-seat Volkskammer, having run on a platform of speedy reunification with West Germany. The East German branch of the Social Democratic Party (SPD), which had been dissolved in 1946 and refounded only six months before the elections, finished second with 88 seats. The former Socialist Unity Party of Germany, renamed the Party of Democratic Socialism (PDS), running in a free election for the first time, finished third with 66 seats.

The Alliance was just short of the 201 seats needed to govern alone. Lothar de Maizière of the CDU invited the SPD to join his Alliance partners – the German Social Union (DSU) and Democratic Awakening (DA) – in a grand coalition. The SPD was initially cold to de Maizière's offer, in part because of the presence of the right-wing DSU in de Maizière's grouping; the SPD had originally been willing to govern alongside all parties other than the PDS and DSU. However, they ultimately agreed. The government, which was able to amend the constitution thanks to its two-thirds majority, subsequently organised and ratified the reunification of Germany, resulting in the dissolution of the German Democratic Republic on 3 October 1990.

Background

The Peaceful Revolution of 1989 resulted in the Socialist Unity Party of Germany giving up its monopoly on power, and permitting opposition parties to operate for the first time. They began to form in large numbers throughout November and December 1989. Opposition groups formed the East German Round Table, which was joined by representatives of the SED to negotiate reforms; at its first meeting on 7 December 1989, the Round Table agreed that free elections to the Volkskammer would be held on 6 May 1990.

Electoral system
On 20 February 1990 the Volkskammer passed a new electoral law, reducing it in size to 400 members elected via party-list proportional representation, with no electoral threshold. Joint lists between parties were allowed, and a number of parties formed alliances for the election, including the Association of Free Democrats, Alliance 90, and an alliance between the Green Party and Independent Women's Association. Seats were calculated nationally using the largest remainder method, and distributed in multi-member constituencies corresponding to the fifteen Bezirke.

Campaign
The campaign was short and presented the parties with major organizational challenges. The election, originally scheduled for May, was brought forward to March 18 after negotiations between representatives of the Round Table and government of Hans Modrow on 28 January. This meant that the campaign was only seven weeks long.

Only the PDS had party machinery immediately operational as well as the extensive financial resources required for a full-scale campaign. The newly founded parties and groups, by contrast, were often still entangled in debates about their platform and only had minimal operational infrastructure. Civil rights activists had managed to secure offices in many places; thus, both the new groups and old parties were often lacking less in physical infrastructure and more in political and campaign experience. This gap was closed through a massive commitment by the Western parties, which supported their partner parties in the GDR, and were thus able to compensate for the organizational advantage held by the PDS. The CDU, for example, formed "district partnerships": each Eastern CDU district association was supported by a Western CDU district association. Many Western party members took vacations to the East to aid their party in the campaign.

Ahead of the election, the Bavarian Christian Social Union in West Germany allied itself with the Eastern German Social Union. The Free Democratic Party endorsed the hastily-assembled Association of Free Democrats, which included the Liberal Democratic Party of Germany (LDPD) and the minor Free Democratic Party of the GDR. The Alliance for Germany, which included the CDU, DSU, and Democratic Awakening (DA), was also created as an emergency solution. These two alliances, forged six weeks before the election, had to organize their election campaigns in an extremely short time.

The SPD appeared to have favourable starting conditions. As a newly-founded party, it had no ties to the SED, but a high profile and ample resources thanks to its Western counterpart. Most of East Germany's territory had also been a stronghold of the SPD during the Weimar Republic. Meanwhile, the CDU was deprived of a natural base by the lack of any significant Catholic population in the country, with the sole exception of Eichsfeld on the Thuringian border. Additionally, several older parties, including the CDU, LDPD, and NDPD, were former "block parties" which were subordinate to the SED until 1989. This association created considerable doubt about their ability to credibly portray themselves as parties of change. Election forecasts predicted a clear victory for the Social Democrats: in a survey published at the beginning of February, the SPD was favoured by 54 percent of voters, followed by the PDS with 12 percent and the CDU with 11 percent.

Oskar Lafontaine, who had been elected as the Western SPD's Chancellor candidate for the next federal election, was sceptical about reunification and pessimistic about the SPD's chances of victory in either country. At the SPD's party conference in Berlin in December 1989, he warned of "national drunkenness" reunification could inspire, and described membership of a united Germany in NATO as "historical nonsense". Meanwhile, West German CDU leader and Chancellor Helmut Kohl made unification the primary goal for his party in both the East and West. To promote this position, almost 400 events were held during the campaign featuring around 80 top politicians from the CDU and CSU; the Alliance for Germany held around 1,400 election events in total. At one such event on 20 February 1990 in Erfurt, 150,000 people gathered to see Kohl; 200,000 attended when he spoke in Chemnitz.

Three days before the election, the lead candidate of Democratic Awakening, Wolfgang Schnur, was exposed as a Stasi collaborator by Der Spiegel.

Party programs
The Alliance for Germany presented its election program under the title "Never again socialism" („Nie wieder Sozialismus“). Its key points included German reunification using the Basic Law for the Federal Republic of Germany as an all-German constitution, the establishment of rights to private property and unrestricted freedom of trade, the abolition of all barriers to access for investors from the West, and the immediate introduction of the Deutsche Mark with an exchange rate of 1:1 to the East German mark. It also promised the establishment of a social security network, an environmental program, and secure energy supply, and the harmonisation of law with the Federal Republic; in particular the abolition of criminal offences related to political activity. Other points were the promotion of monument protection, education reform, the preservation of day nurseries, the re-establishment of the federal states (Länder) and freedom of the press.

At the first party conference of the revived SPD, held in Leipzig from 22 to 25 February 1990, the basic party program was adopted, as was its election program. The core was the demand for an ecologically-oriented social market economy.

The PDS election program was entitled "Democratic Freedom for All - Social Security for Everyone". The PDS described itself as a left-wing/socialist party campaigning for a humane working world, and striving for a socially and ecologically-oriented market economy that pursues social security for all, especially the socially disadvantaged, based on merit. In addition, it demanded radical disarmament in both the East and West, solidarity between people, and responsible management of nature. It stated that the GDR's social values and achievements should be preserved, stating these to include the right to work, the system of children's institutions, the involvement of cooperative and public property in the economy, and anti-fascism and internationalism. Central to its platform were demands to maintain the status quo with regard to the continued employment of the former SED members and land reform undertaken by the SED. Instead of unification with the West, the PDS advocated the creation of a confederal structure between the two countries while preserving statehood, and sought a gradual transition to a neutral and demilitarized German confederation within the framework of European unity.

Conduct

There was criticism of the preparations for the elections and the environment in which they took place. Writer Michael Schneider criticised what he saw as massive interference by Western politicians in the GDR election campaign, which he characterised as dominated by Western personalities and party volunteers, and funded partly by taxpayer money from the West.

Civil rights activist and founding member of the New Forum, Jens Reich, raised similar concerns. In 2009, 20 years after the Peaceful Revolution, he commented on the development of democracy in the GDR: "The Bonn hippopotamus came in such a mass that you were simply helpless. The entire apparatus of the West was simply brought to the East in the election campaign. We had nothing to oppose. These were western elections exported to the GDR."

Opinion polls
In 2005, Forschungsgruppe Wahlen researcher Matthias Jung, who was involved in organising opinion polling for the election, spoke of the difficulties of the task. He attributed this to the unpredictable behaviour of the electorate as well as the total lack of infrastructure and methods for gauging public opinion, which forced the institute to build an entirely new polling model. Despite beginning work at the end of 1989, FW only released one poll before the election, which Jung claimed accurately predicted the CDU victory. This may refer to a FW poll showing that 35% of voters believed an Alliance for Germany-led government would be most capable of solving the country's problems, while only 27% believed an SPD-led government would; 29% believed a grand coalition would be most capable. This was in stark contrast to other polls, conducted without reliable methods, all of which forecast a landslide SPD victory.

Results

Votes by Bezirk

Seats by Bezirk

Votes by state
In order to determine the composition of the East German representatives in the Bundestag between German reunification and the first post-reunification elections in December 1990, the results of the 1990 Volkskammer election were recounted, using the new states of Germany as constituencies. This was possible since the original election results were declared on the Kreis level, and the states were re-established by simply amalgamating Kreise together. The results in each Kreis forming a state were summed up to determine the statewide result. The recount fixed the number of Volkskammer members from each party who would be co-opted into the Bundestag.

Aftermath
The newly elected Volkskammer was constituted on 5 April 1990, and elected Sabine Bergmann-Pohl of the CDU as its president. As the State Council of the GDR was dissolved at the same time, she became East Germany's interim head of state. Four days later, after protracted negotiations, Lothar de Maizière announced the formation of a grand coalition between the Alliance for Germany, SPD, and BFD. On 12 April 1990, he was elected Prime Minister of the GDR by the Volkskammer with 265 votes in favour, 108 against, and 9 abstentions. The new cabinet was also confirmed. The partners in the coalition commanded a two-thirds supermajority in the Volkskammer, enough to pass amendments to the constitution.

The new parliament quickly passed several pieces of major legislation, including a new law regarding local government on 17 May, a law ratifying the monetary, economic, and social union with the Federal Republic of Germany on 18 May (which became effective on 1 July), and constitutional amendments on 17 June. On 21 June, the Volkskammer formed a special committee, chaired by Joachim Gauck, to control the dissolution of the Ministry for State Security (Stasi).

On 20 September 1990, the Volkskammer voted 299–80 to accept the Treaty on the Final Settlement with Respect to Germany, which had earlier been approved in a 442–47 vote by the West German Bundestag. The treaty stipulated that East Germany would unify its territory with Federal Republic of Germany via Article 23 of the Basic Law, meaning that East Germany, after 40 years of existence, would cease to exist, and the Volkskammer along with it. Its last legislative period therefore only lasted four and a half months. The treaty took effect on 3 October 1990. On the same day, 144 of the 400 former Volkskammer deputies became members of the Bundestag: 63 from the CDU, 33 from the SPD, 24 from the PDS, 9 from the BFD, 8 from the DSU, and 7 from Alliance 90 and the Green Party. The distribution of seats between these parties was determined by recalculating the results of the 1990 elections on a per-state basis. Their tenure came to an end two months later with the first all-German federal election on 2 December 1990.

Notes

References

East Germany
General
East
Democratization
Peaceful Revolution
Elections in East Germany
East Germany